Toilet-Bound Hanako-kun is a television anime series adapted from the manga, written and illustrated by Iro Aida. The series is directed by Masaomi Andō at Lerche, with Yasuhiro Nakanishi writing the scripts, Mayuka Itou designing the characters, and Yukari Hashimoto composing the music. It premiered on January 9, 2020 on TBS, SUN, CBC, and BS-TBS. The opening theme is "No.7" performed by Chibaku Shōnen Band, and the ending theme is "Tiny Light" performed by Akari Kitō. Funimation has licensed the series and it has run for 12 episodes.


Episode List

Notes

References

External links
  

Toilet-Bound Hanako-kun